Temnora radiata is a moth of the family Sphingidae. It is found from West Africa to Angola.

It is similar to Temnora mirabilis, but lacks the continuous, evenly curved pale postmedian line on the forewing upperside.

References

Temnora
Moths described in 1893
Insects of the Democratic Republic of the Congo
Insects of West Africa
Insects of Angola
Fauna of the Central African Republic
Fauna of Gabon
Fauna of Togo
Moths of Africa